Aaron Bronson Clapp (July 1856 – January 13, 1914) was a first baseman in Major League Baseball for the 1879 Troy Trojans. Born in Ithaca, New York, Clapp was the younger brother, John Clapp, one of the greatest catchers in of his day. 

Clapp moved to Sayre, Pennsylvania, around the turn of the century, and was working as a foreman of  a paint shop. He died in Sayre of cancer in 1914.

References

External links

1856 births
1914 deaths
Date of birth missing
19th-century baseball players
Baseball players from New York (state)
Major League Baseball first basemen
Troy Trojans players
Hornellsville Hornells players
Albany (minor league baseball) players
Baltimore (minor league baseball) players
Rochester (minor league baseball) players
People from Sayre, Pennsylvania